Mohamed Ali Akid (5 July 1949 – 11 April 1979) was a Tunisian football forward who played for Tunisia in the 1978 FIFA World Cup. He also played for CS Sfaxien and Al-Riyadh. The official version was that Akid was struck by lightning during a training session at his Saudi Arabian club Al-Riyadh on 11 April 1979.

The circumstances surrounding the death have fuelled a controversy between his surviving family and the authorities. After revolution, his family has requested for an autopsy to determine the cause of his death. The autopsy on 18 July 2012 confirmed the presence of two shots in his body and the son of Akid confirmed the implication of the Crown prince Nayef bin Abdulaziz Al Saud.

References

1949 births
1979 deaths
Deaths from lightning strikes
Tunisian footballers
Tunisian expatriate footballers
Tunisia international footballers
Association football forwards
CS Sfaxien players
1978 FIFA World Cup players
1978 African Cup of Nations players
Al-Riyadh SC players
Expatriate footballers in Saudi Arabia
Saudi Professional League players
Tunisian expatriate sportspeople in Saudi Arabia
Sport deaths in Saudi Arabia